Bemisia is a genus of whitefly in the family Aleyrodidae.

Species
Bemisia afer Priesner & Hosny, 1934
Bemisia alni Takahashi, 1957
Bemisia antennata Gameel, 1968
Bemisia bambusae Takahashi, 1942
Bemisia berbericola (Cockerell, 1896)
Bemisia capitata Regu & David, 1991
Bemisia caudasculptura Quaintance & Baker, 1937
Bemisia centroamericana Martin, 2005
Bemisia combreticula Bink-Moenen, 1983
Bemisia confusa Danzig, 1964
Bemisia cordylinidis Dumbleton, 1961
Bemisia decipiens (Maskell, 1896)
Bemisia elliptica Takahashi, 1960
Bemisia flocculosa Gill & Holder, 2011
Bemisia formosana Takahashi, 1933
Bemisia giffardi (Kotinsky, 1907)
Bemisia gigantea Martin, 1999
Bemisia grossa Singh, 1931
Bemisia guierae Bink-Moenen, 1983
Bemisia hirta Bink-Moenen, 1983
Bemisia lampangensis Takahashi, 1942
Bemisia lauracea Martin, Aguiar & Pita, 1996
Bemisia leakii (Peal, 1903)
Bemisia medinae Gomez-Menor, 1954
Bemisia mesasiatica Danzig, 1969
Bemisia moringae David & Subramaniam, 1976
Bemisia multituberculata Sundararaj & David, 1990
Bemisia ovata Goux, 1940
Bemisia poinsettiae Hempel, 1922
Bemisia pongamiae Takahashi, 1931
Bemisia porteri Corbett, 1935
Bemisia psiadiae Takahashi, 1955
Bemisia puerariae Takahashi, 1955
Bemisia religiosa (Peal, 1903)
Bemisia shinanoensis Kuwana, 1922
Bemisia spiraeae Young, 1944
Bemisia spiraeoides Mound & Halsey, 1978
Bemisia subdecipiens Martin, 1999
Bemisia sugonjaevi Danzig, 1969
Bemisia tabaci (Gennadius, 1889)(formerly known as Bemisia argentifolii) (silverleaf whitefly) 
Bemisia tuberculata Bondar, 1923

References

Sternorrhyncha